sec-Butyl acetate, or s-butyl acetate, is an ester commonly used as a solvent in lacquers and enamels, where it is used in the production of acyclic polymers, vinyl resins, and nitrocellulose. It is a clear flammable liquid with a sweet smell.

sec-Butyl acetate has three isomers that are also acetate esters: n-butyl acetate, isobutyl acetate, and tert-butyl acetate.

History 

The first method of production of sec-butyl acetate was the esterification of sec-butanol and acetic anhydride It was experimentally determined and published in 1946 by Rolf Altschul.

Toxicology 

The  for rats is 13g/kg. Exposure in humans to significant quantities of sec-butyl acetate can cause irritation to the eyes, mouth, throat, nose, and skin. Ingestion and inhalation of sec-butyl acetate can cause central nervous system depression producing symptoms of dizziness and disorientation.

Nomenclature 

sec-Butyl acetate is chiral. It has one stereocenter, carbon 2 in the sec-butyl group. The names of the two enantiomers are:
 [(2S)-butan-2-yl] acetate, (+)-sec-butyl acetate
 [(2R)-butan-2-yl] acetate, (-)-sec-butyl acetate

References

External links 
 ChemExpr.com
 CDC - NIOSH Pocket Guide to Chemical Hazards

Ester solvents
Acetate esters
Sweet-smelling chemicals